Wang Ke may refer to:

 Wang Ke (Tang dynasty) (王珂), late-Tang military governor
 Wang Ke (general) (王克; born 1931), People's Liberation Army general
 Wang Ke (footballer) (王珂; born 1983)